Urgleptes puerulus is a species of beetle in the family Cerambycidae. It was described by Melzer in 1932.

References

Urgleptes
Beetles described in 1932